Christina Thürmer-Rohr (born 1936) is a feminist philosopher and social scientist, and is a Professor Emeritus at Technische Universität Berlin. She has been largely collected by libraries worldwide.

Academic work
Her publications include: Vagabundinnen. Feministische Essays (1987), Verlorene Narrenfreiheit (1994) and various articles and essays that have been published in cultural political magazines and journals. Vagabundinnen was translated into English by Lise Weil and published by Beacon Press.

References

External links 
 Christina Thürmer-Rohr. "Die unheilbare Pluralität der Welt-von Patriachatskritik zur Totalitarismusforschung"

German feminists
German philosophers
German social scientists
20th-century German writers
Living people
1936 births
20th-century German women
Academic staff of the Technical University of Berlin